1,8-Naphthyridine is an organic compound with the formula C8H6N2.  It is the most well-studied of the six isomeric naphthyridines, a subset of diazanaphthalenes with nitrogen in the separate rings.   Enoxacin, nalidixic acid, and trovafloxacin are 1,8-naphthyridine derivatives with antibacterial properties related to the fluoroquinolones.

Coordination chemistry
With flanking nitrogen centers, 1,8-naphthyridine serves as a binucleating ligand in coordination chemistry.

References

Naphthyridines